Littoridinops is a genus of very small aquatic snails, operculate gastropod mollusks in the family Hydrobiidae.

Species
Species within the genus Littoridinops include:

 Littoridinops monroensis (Frauenfeld, 1863)
 Littoridinops palustris F. G. Thompson, 1968
 Littoridinops tenuipes (Couper, 1844)

References

Hydrobiidae